The Veertien Mie Basketball is a professional basketball team that competes in the Japanese B.League.They are based in Yokkaichi, Mie.

Roster

Notable players
Shuto Mizoguchi
Dieye Sakamoto
Motoshi Shimada
Yusuke Takamatsu

Coaches
Masao Kuda

Arenas

Yokkaichi General Gymnasium
Ano Central Park Gymnasium
Hisai Gymnasium
Saorina

References

External links

 
Basketball teams established in 2020
Basketball teams in Japan
2020 establishments in Japan